Mazraecheh (also Romanized as Mazra‘ehcheh; also known as Mazra‘echeh) is a village in Dizicheh Rural District, in the Central District of Mobarakeh County, Isfahan Province, Iran. At the 2006 census, its population was 452, in 126 families.

References 

Populated places in Mobarakeh County